The following radio stations broadcast on FM frequency 103.2 MHz:

Australia
2CBA at Sydney, NSW

China 
 CNR Music Radio in Hangzhou
 CNR The Voice of China in Changsha (during 05:00-23:00), Xiangtan, Yiyang, Yueyang, Yulin, and Zhuzhou

Indonesia
 Radio Juan FM in Batam and Singapore

Malaysia
 My in Miri, Sarawak and Bukit Lambir

United Kingdom
Insanity Radio 103.2FM 
 Capital South in Hampshire
 Mansfield 103.2 FM

References

Lists of radio stations by frequency